Zhou Boqi  (1298–1369) was a Chinese court poet during the Yuan Dynasty. Zhou was born in Raozhou (now Boyang) but grew up in Beijing, and in his early career worked there as a magistrate and later as Senior Compiler for Imperial Academy. He was well known for his seal script calligraphy.

References

Yuan dynasty poets
Yuan dynasty calligraphers
1298 births
1369 deaths
14th-century Chinese poets
Writers from Maoming
Poets from Guangdong
Artists from Guangdong
14th-century Chinese calligraphers